Aerenea batesi is a species of beetle in the family Cerambycidae. It was described by Monné in 1980. It is known from Brazil.

References

Compsosomatini
Beetles described in 1980